The 2021–22 Bangladesh Championship League was the 10th season of the Bangladesh Championship League since its establishment in 2012. A total of 12 football clubs are competing in the league. The Brothers Union withdrew from the league due to the internal mismanagement and financial issue of the club. The league kicked off from 20 February and concluded on 13 June 2022.

Swadhinata KS were the champion of previous 2020–21 season.

Team changes
The following teams have changed division since the previous season:

To BCL 
Directly promoted

 BFF Elite Football Academy
 AFC Uttara
 Gopalganj Sporting Club

Relegated from the BPL
 Brothers Union

From BCL 
Promoted to the BPL
 Swadhinata KS

Relegated to Dhaka Senior Division Football League
 Victoria SC 
 Dhaka City FC 

N.B: No team promoted from lower tier as the Dhaka Senior Division Football League was not held last season.

Venue
All matches were played at BSSS Mostafa Kamal Stadium in Dhaka, Bangladesh.

Team locations

Personnel and sponsoring

League table

Results

Positions by round
The following table lists the positions of teams after each week of matches. In order to preserve the chronological evolution, any postponed matches are not included to the round at which they were originally scheduled but added to the full round they were played immediately afterward.

Season statistics

Goalscorers

Hat-tricks

Own goals 
† Bold Club indicates winner of the match

Discipline

Most Red cards

Most Yellow cards

Cleansheets

See also
2021–22 Bangladesh Premier League (football)
2021–22 Dhaka Senior Division Football League

References

2022 in Bangladeshi football
2022 in Bangladeshi sport
2022 in Bangladesh
2022 in association football
2022 in Asian football